Pulicherla mandal is one of the 66 mandals in Chittoor district of the Indian state of Andhra Pradesh.

Geography 
The mandal headquarters are located at Reddivaripalle. The mandal is bounded by Chinnagottigallu, Chandragiri, Rompicherla, Pakala, Pileru, Sodam and Irala mandals. Pulichelra is located between Kalluru and Rompicherla road.

Infrastructure 
Village has a railway station. The train root connects Dharmavaram and Tirupati.
The only Bank available in the village is an Indian bank with an ATM facility and One SBI ATM also available.
Pulicherla had a nutrine chocolate factory, it was closed long back.Pulicherla is Contenting palace to Bangalore Chennai.

Demographics 

The 2011 census shows that the mandal had a population of 37,108. The total population consists of 18,742 males and 18,366 females —a sex ratio of 978 females per 1000 males. 3,598 children are in the age group of 0–6 years, of which 1,857 are boys and 1,741 are girls. The average literacy rate stands at 67.49% with 22,617 literates.

Towns and villages 

 census, the mandal has 24 villages.

The settlements in the mandal are listed below:

 Ayyavandlapalle
 Bandaruvaripalle
 Bodireddigaripalle
 Devalampet
 E.Ramireddigari Palle
 Gaddamvaripalle
Muppireddigaripalle
 Kallur
 Kavetigaripalle
 Mangalampeta
 Ramireddigaripalle
 Rayavaripalle
 Reddivaripalle †
 Vallivetivaripalle
 Venkatadasari Palle
 Yellankivaripallle
 Vagallavaripalli
 Desireddigaripalli
 Balireddigaripalli
 Kammapalli
 Kokkuvaripalli
 Palem
 Vankayalapativaripalli
 Bestapalli

† – Mandal Headquarters

See also 
 List of mandals in Andhra Pradesh

References

Mandals in Chittoor district